Big Hill Pond State Park is a state park in the southwestern part of McNairy County in southwestern Tennessee.

Description

Cypress Creek and the Tuscumbia River border the property. The park's central feature is  Travis McNatt Lake. The namesake Big Hill Pond was formed by excavation in 1853 as a borrow pit that was a source for soil used to build a levee across the Tuscumbia and Cypress Creek bottoms for the Memphis and Charleston Railroad. In addition, the floodplains of the Tuscumbia River and Cypress Creek contain small oxbow lakes and sloughs that provide desirable habitat for waterfowl, other wildlife, and fish. A large stand of cypress trees has grown up in and around Big Hill Pond, which is accessible by four-wheel-drive vehicles. The park contains the Big Hill Pond Fortification, which was the site of Union defenses above the Memphis and Charleston Railroad during the Civil War.

External links

 
 U.S. Geological Survey Map at the U.S. Geological Survey Map Website. Retrieved December 6th, 2022.

State parks of Tennessee
Protected areas of McNairy County, Tennessee
1853 establishments in Tennessee